Kégnéko  is a town and sub-prefecture in the Mamou Prefecture in the Mamou Region of Guinea. It lies on the southern side of the river of the same name.

References

Sub-prefectures of the Mamou Region